Mateusz Cholewiak (born 5 February 1990) is a Polish professional footballer who plays as a left winger or a left back for Górnik Zabrze.

Club career

Cholewiak's first youth team was in Jasło, close to his birthplace of Krosno. In 2007 Cholewiak moved to UKS SMS Łódź, a team known for its focus and development on youth players. After 4 seasons with SMS Łódź, Cholewiak moved to Puszcza Niepołomice While with Puszcza, the team finished 2nd in the II liga East and achieved a historic promotion, with promotion to the I liga for the first time in their history. After being unable to help Puszcza avoid relegation in 2013-14, he joined Stal Mielec at the end of the season. Cholewiak spent 3 and a half seasons with Stal, during that time he amassed nearly 100 league appearances with the club, while also scoring 20 goals. In January 2018 Cholewiak moved to Śląsk Wrocław to play in the Ekstraklasa for the first time.

Honours

Club

Legia Warsaw
 Ekstraklasa: 2019–20, 2020–21

References

Living people
1990 births
People from Krosno
Polish footballers
Association football defenders
Association football wingers
Stal Mielec players
Puszcza Niepołomice players
Śląsk Wrocław players
Legia Warsaw players
Górnik Zabrze players
Ekstraklasa players
I liga players
II liga players